Liver cancer (also known as hepatic cancer, primary hepatic cancer, or primary hepatic malignancy) is cancer that starts in the liver. Liver cancer can be primary (starts in liver) or secondary (meaning cancer which has spread from elsewhere to the liver, known as liver metastasis). Liver metastasis is more common than that which starts in the liver. Liver cancer is increasing globally. 

Primary liver cancer is globally the sixth-most frequent cancer and the fourth-leading cause of death from cancer. In 2018, it occurred in 841,000 people and resulted in 782,000 deaths globally. Higher rates of liver cancer occur where hepatitis B and C are common, including Asia and sub-Saharan Africa. Males are more often affected with  hepatocellular carcinoma (HCC) than females. Diagnosis is most frequent among those 55 to 65 years old. 

The leading cause of liver cancer is cirrhosis due to hepatitis B, hepatitis C or alcohol. Other causes include aflatoxin, non-alcoholic fatty liver disease and liver flukes. The most common types are HCC, which makes up 80% of cases and  intrahepatic cholangiocarcinoma. The diagnosis may be supported by blood tests and medical imaging, with confirmation by tissue biopsy.

Given that there are many different causes of liver cancer, there are many approaches to liver cancer prevention. These efforts include immunization against hepatitis B, hepatitis B treatment, hepatitis C treatment, decreasing alcohol use, decreasing exposure to aflatoxin in agriculture, and management of obesity and diabetes. Screening is recommended in those with chronic liver disease. For example, it is recommended that people with chronic liver disease who are at risk for hepatocellular carcinoma be screened every 6 months using ultrasound imaging.  

Because liver cancer is an umbrella term for many types of cancer, the signs and symptoms depend on what type of cancer is present. Symptoms can be vague and broad. Cholangiocarcinoma is associated with sweating, jaundice, abdominal pain, weight loss and liver enlargement. Hepatocellular carcinoma is associated with abdominal mass, abdominal pain, emesis, anemia, back pain, jaundice, itching, weight loss and fever.

Treatment options may include surgery, targeted therapy and radiation therapy. In certain cases, ablation therapy, embolization therapy or liver transplantation may be used.

Classification
Liver cancer can come from the liver parenchyma as well as other structures within the liver such as the bile duct, blood vessels and immune cells There are many sub-types of liver cancer, the most common of which are described below.

Hepatocellular carcinoma 

The most frequent liver cancer, accounting for approximately 75% of all primary liver cancers, is hepatocellular carcinoma (HCC). HCC is a cancer formed by liver cells, known as hepatocytes, that become malignant. In terms of cancer deaths, worldwide HCC is considered the 3rd most common cause of  cancer mortalities.

In terms of HCC diagnosis, it is recommended that people with risk factors (including known chronic liver disease, cirrhosis, etc.) should receive  screening ultrasounds. If the ultrasound shows a focal area that is larger than 1 centimeter in size, patients should then get a triple-phase contrast-enhanced CT or MRI imaging. HCC can then be diagnosed radiologically using the Liver Imaging Reporting and Data System (LI-RADS). There is also a variant type of HCC that consists of both HCC and cholangiocarcinoma.

Intrahepatic cholangiocarcinoma 

Cancer of the bile duct (cholangiocarcinoma and cholangiocellular cystadenocarcinoma) account for approximately 6% of primary liver cancers. Intrahepatic cholangiocarcinoma (CCA) is an epithelial cancer of the intra-hepatic biliary tree branches. Intrahepatic CCA is the second leading cause of primary liver cancer. It is more common in men and usually is diagnosed in 60-70 year olds. Risk factors for development of intrahepatic CCA include opisthorchus viverrini infection, Clonorchis sinensis infection, sclerosing cholangitis, choledochal cysts, past procedures of the biliary tree, exposure to thorotrast and dioxins, and cirrhosis. This cancer is usually asymptomatic until the disease has progressed. Symptoms include abdominal pain, night sweats, weight loss, and fatigue. Liver markers that can be increased with intrahepatic CCA are carcinoembryonic antigen (CEA), CA19-9, and CA-125.

Angiosarcoma and hemangiosarcoma 

These are rare and aggressive liver cancers, yet are the third most common primary liver cancer making up 0.1-2.0% of primary liver cancer. Angiosarcoma and hemangiosarcoma of the liver come from the blood vessel's endothelial layer. These tumors have poor outcomes because they grow rapidly and metastasise easily. They are also hard to diagnose but are typically suspected on CT or MRI imaging that shows focal lesions with differing amounts of echogenicity (these tumors have a lot of bleeding or hemorrhage and subsequent dying of tissue (necrosis)). Biopsy with histopathological evaluation yields the definitive diagnosis.  While the cause is often never identified (75% are idiopathic), they are associated with exposures to substances such as vinyl chloride, arsenic, thorotrast (e.g. occupational exposure). Radiation is also a risk factor. In adults, these tumors are more common in males; however, in children they are more common in females.

Even with surgery prognosis is poor with most individuals not living longer than six months after diagnosis. Only 3% of individuals live longer than two years.

Hepatoblastoma 

Another type of cancer formed by liver cells is hepatoblastoma, which is specifically formed by immature liver cells. It is a rare malignant tumor that primarily develops in children, and accounts for approximately 1% of all cancers in children and 79% of all primary liver cancers under the age of 15. Most hepatoblastomas form in the right lobe.

Metastasis to liver 
Many cancers found in the liver are not true liver cancers but are cancers from other sites in the body that have spread to the liver (known as metastases). Frequently, the site of origin is the gastrointestinal tract, since the liver is close to many of these metabolically active, blood-rich organs near to blood vessels and lymph nodes (such as pancreatic cancer, stomach cancer, colon cancer and carcinoid tumors mainly of the appendix), but also from breast cancer, ovarian cancer, lung cancer, renal cancer, prostate cancer.

Children 
The Children's Oncology Group (COG) has developed a protocol to help diagnose and manage childhood liver tumors.

Causes

Viral infection

Viral infection with hepatitis C virus (HCV) or Hepatitis B virus (HBV) is the chief cause of liver cancer in the world today, accounting for 80% of HCC. Men with chronic HCV or HBV are more likely to develop HCC than women with chronic HCV or HBV; however, the reasons for this gender difference is unknown.  HBV infection is also linked to cholangiocarcinoma. The role of viruses other than HCV or HBV in liver cancer is much less clear, even though there is some evidence that co-infection of HBV and hepatitis D virus may increase the risk for HCC.

HBV and HCV can lead to HCC, because these viral infections cause massive inflammation, fibrosis, and eventual cirrhosis occurs within the liver. In addition, many genetic and epigenetic changes are formed in liver cells during HCV and HBV infection, which is a major factor in the production of the liver tumors. The viruses induce malignant changes in cells by altering gene methylation, affecting gene expression, and promoting or repressing cellular signal transduction pathways. By doing this, the viruses can prevent cells from undergoing a programmed form of cell death (apoptosis) and promote viral replication and persistence.

HBV and HCV also induce malignant changes by causing DNA damage and genomic instability. This is by creating reactive oxygen species, express proteins that interfere with DNA repair enzymes, and HCV causes activation of a mutator enzyme.

Cirrhosis

In addition to virus-related cirrhosis described above, other causes of cirrhosis can lead to HCC. Alcohol intake correlates with risk of HCC, and the risk is far greater in individuals with an alcohol-induced cirrhotic liver. There are a few disorders that are known to cause cirrhosis and lead to cancer, including hereditary hemochromatosis and primary biliary cirrhosis.

Aflatoxin

Aflatoxin exposure can lead to the development of HCC. The aflatoxins are a group of chemicals produced by the fungi Aspergillus flavus (the name comes from A. flavus toxin) and A. parasiticus. Food contamination by the fungi leads to ingestion of the chemicals, which are very toxic to the liver. Common foodstuffs contaminated with the toxins are cereals, peanuts, and other vegetables. The amount (dose) and how long (duration) that a person is in contact with aflatoxin is associated with HCC. Contamination of food is common in Africa, South-East Asia, and China. The mechanism by which aflatoxins cause cancer is through mutations and epigenetic alterations.  Aflatoxins induce a spectrum of mutations, including in the p53 tumor suppressor gene, which is a mutation seen in many types of cancers.  Mutation in p53, presumably in conjunction with other aflatoxin-induced mutations and epigenetic alterations, is likely a common cause of aflatoxin-induced carcinogenesis.

Nonalcoholic steatohepatitis (NASH) and Nonalcoholic fatty liver (NAFL) 
NASH and NAFL is beginning to be called a risk factor for liver cancer, particularly HCC. In recent years, there has been a noted increase in liver transplantations for HCC that was attributable to NASH. More research is needed in this area and NASH/NAFL.

Other risk factors in adults
 High grade dysplastic nodules are precancerous lesions of the liver. Within two years, there is a risk for cancer arising from these nodules of 30–40%.
 Obesity and metabolic syndrome have emerged as an important risk factor, as they can lead to steatohepatitis.
 Diabetes increases the risk for HCC.
 Smoking increases the risk for HCC compared to non-smokers and previous smokers.
 There is around 5-10% lifetime risk of cholangiocarcinoma in people with primary sclerosing cholangitis.
 Liver fluke infection increases the risk for cholangiocarcinoma, and this is the reason why Thailand has particularly high rates of this cancer.
 Choledochal cysts, Caroli's disease, and congenital hepatic fibrosis are associated with cholangiocarcinoma development.
 Genetic conditions: untreated hereditary hemochromatosis, alpha-1-antitrypsin deficiency, glycogen storage diseases, porphyria cutanea tarda, Wilson's disease, tyrosinemia have all been associated with development of HCC.
 Oral contraceptive pill: There is insufficient evidence to label oral contraceptives as a risk factor. However, recent studies have found that taking oral contraceptives for longer than 5 years is associated with HCC.

Children
Childhood liver cancer is uncommon. The liver cancer sub-types most commonly seen in children are hepatoblastoma, hepatocellular carcinoma, embryomal sarcoma of liver, infantile choriocarcinoma of liver, and biliary rhabdomyosarcoma. Increased risk for liver cancer in children can be caused by Beckwith–Wiedemann syndrome (associated with hepatoblastoma), familial adenomatous polyposis (associated with hepatoblastoma), low birth weight (associated with hepatoblastoma), Progressive familial intrahepatic cholestasis (associated with HCC) and Trisomy 18 (associated with hepatoblastoma).

Diagnosis 

Many imaging modalities are used to aid in the diagnosis of liver cancer. For HCC these include medical ultrasound, computed tomography (CT) and magnetic resonance imaging (MRI). When imaging the liver with ultrasound, large lesions are likely to be HCC (e.g., a mass greater than 2 cm has more than 95% chance of being HCC).Given the blood flow to the liver, HCC would be most visible when the contrast flows through the arteries of the liver (also called the arterial phase) rather than when the contrast flows through the veins (also called the venous phase). Sometimes doctors will get a liver biopsy, if they are worried about HCC and the imaging studies (CT or MRI) do not have clear results.  The majority of cholangiocarcimas occur in the hilar region of the liver, and often present as bile duct obstruction. If the cause of obstruction is suspected to be malignant, endoscopic retrograde cholangiopancreatography (ERCP), ultrasound, CT, MRI and magnetic resonance cholangiopancreatography (MRCP) are used.

Tumor markers, chemicals sometimes found in the blood of people with cancer, can be helpful in diagnosing and monitoring the course of liver cancers. High levels of alpha-fetoprotein (AFP) in the blood can be found in many cases of HCC and intrahepatic cholangiocarcinoma. Of note, AFP is most useful for monitoring if liver cancers come back after treatment rather than for initial diagnosis. Cholangiocarcinoma can be detected with these commonly used tumor markers: carbohydrate antigen 19-9 (CA 19–9), carcinoembryonic antigen (CEA) and cancer antigen 125 (CA125). These tumor markers are found in primary liver cancers, as well as in other cancers and certain other disorders.

Prevention
Prevention of cancers can be separated into primary, secondary, and tertiary prevention. Primary prevention preemptively reduces exposure to a risk factor for liver cancer. One of the most successful primary liver cancer preventions is vaccination against hepatitis B. Vaccination against the hepatitis C virus is currently unavailable. Other forms of primary prevention are aimed at limiting transmission of these viruses by promoting safe injection practices, screening blood donation products, and screening high-risk asymptomatic individuals. Aflatoxin exposure can be avoided by post-harvest intervention to discourage mold, which has been effective in west Africa. Reducing alcohol use disorder, obesity, and diabetes mellitus would also reduce rates of liver cancer. Diet control in hemochromatosis could decrease the risk of iron overload, decreasing the risk of cancer.

Secondary prevention includes both cure of the agent involved in the formation of cancer (carcinogenesis) and the prevention of carcinogenesis if this is not possible. Cure of virus-infected individuals is not possible, but treatment with antiviral drugs can decrease the risk of liver cancer. Chlorophyllin may have potential in reducing the effects of aflatoxin.

Tertiary prevention includes treatments to prevent the recurrence of liver cancer. These include the use of surgical interventions, chemotherapy drugs, and antiviral drugs.

Treatment

General considerations 
Like many cancers, treatment depends on the specific type of liver cancer as well as stage of the cancer. The main way cancer is staged is based on the TMN staging systems. There are also liver cancer specific staging systems, each of which has treatment options that may result in a non recurrence of cancer, or cure  (see Radio Frequency Ablation) For example, for HCC it is common to use the Barcelona Clinic Liver Cancer Staging System. 

Treatments include surgery, medications, and ablation methods, which are described in the sections below. There are many chemotherapeutic drugs approved for liver cancer including: atezolizumab, nivolumab, keytruda, stivarga, etc. Increasingly, immunotherapy agents (also called targeted cancer therapies or precision medicine) is being used to treat hepatobiliary cancers.

Hepatocellular carcinoma

Partial surgical resection is the recommended treatment for hepatocellular carcinoma (HCC) when patients have sufficient hepatic function reserve.  5-year survival rates after resection have massively improved over the last few decades and can now ranges from 41 to 74%. However, recurrence rates after resection can exceed 70%, whether due to spread of the initial tumor or formation of new tumors . Liver transplantation can also be considered in cases of HCC where this form of treatment can be tolerated and the tumor fits specific criteria (such as the Milan criteria). In general, patients who are being considered for liver transplantation have multiple hepatic lesions, severe underlying liver dysfunction, or both.

Percutaneous ablation is the only non-surgical treatment that can offer cure. There are many forms of percutaneous ablation, which consist of either injecting chemicals into the liver (ethanol or acetic acid) or producing extremes of temperature using radio frequency ablation, microwaves, lasers or cryotherapy. Of these, radio frequency ablation has one of the best reputations in HCC, but the limitations include inability to treat tumors close to other organs and blood vessels due to heat generation and the heat sink effect, respectively. In addition, long-term of outcomes of percutaneous ablation procedures for HCC have not been well studied. In general, surgery is the preferred treatment modality when possible.

Systemic chemotherapeutics are not routinely used in HCC, although local chemotherapy may be used in a procedure known as transarterial chemoembolization (TACE). In this procedure, drugs that kill cancer cells and interrupt the blood supply are applied to the tumor. Because most systemic drugs have no efficacy in the treatment of HCC, research into the molecular pathways involved in the production of liver cancer produced sorafenib, a targeted therapy drug that prevents cell proliferation and blood cell growth. Sorafenib obtained FDA approval for the treatment of advanced hepatocellular carcinoma in November 2007. This drug provides a survival benefit for advanced HCC.

Transarterial radioembolization (TRACE) is another option for HCC.  In this procedure, radiation treatment is targeted at the tumor. TRACE is still considered an add on treatment rather than the first choice for treatment of HCC, as dual treatments of radiotherapy plus chemoembolization, local chemotherapy, systemic chemotherapy or targeted therapy drugs may show benefit over radiotherapy alone.

Ablation methods (e.g. radiofrequency ablation or microwave ablation) are also an option for HCC treatment. This method is recommended for small, localized liver tumors as it is recommended that the area treated with radiofrequency ablation should be 2 centimeters or less.

Intrahepatic cholangiocarcinoma
Resection is an option in cholangiocarcinoma, but fewer than 30% of cases of cholangiocarcinoma are resectable at diagnosis. The reason the majority of intrahepatic cholangiocarcinomas are not able to be surgically removed is because there are often multiple focal tumors within the liver. After surgery, recurrence rates are up to 60%. Liver transplant may be used where partial resection is not an option, and adjuvant chemoradiation may benefit some cases.

60% of cholangiocarcinomas form in the perihilar region and photodynamic therapy can be used to improve quality of life and survival time in these un-resectable cases. Photodynamic therapy is a novel treatment that uses light activated molecules to treat the tumor. The compounds are activated in the tumor region by laser light, which causes the release of toxic reactive oxygen species, killing tumor cells.

Systemic chemotherapies such as gemcitabine and cisplatin are sometimes used in inoperable cases of cholangiocarcinoma.

Radio frequency ablation, transarterial chemoembolization and internal radiotherapy (brachytherapy) all show promise in the treatment of cholangiocarcinoma and can sometimes improve bile flow, which can decrease the symptoms a patient experiences.

Radiotherapy may be used in the adjuvant setting or for palliative treatment of cholangiocarcinoma.

Hepatoblastoma

Removing the tumor by either surgical resection or liver transplant can be used in the treatment of hepatoblastoma. In some cases surgery can offer a cure. Chemotherapy may be used before and after surgery and transplant.

Chemotherapy, including cisplatin, vincristine, cyclophosphamide, and doxorubicin are used for the systemic treatment of hepatoblastoma. Out of these drugs, cisplatin seems to be the most effective.

Angiosarcoma and hemangiosarcoma 
Many of these tumors end up not being amenable to surgical treatment. Treatment options include surgically removing parts of the liver that are affected. Liver transplantation and chemotherapy are not effective for angiosarcomas and hemangiosarcomas of the liver.

Epidemiology

Globally, liver cancer is common and increasing. Most recent epidemiological data suggests that liver cancer is in the top 10 for both prevalence and mortality (noted to be the 6th leading cause of cancer and 4th most common cause of death). The Global Burden of Disease Liver Cancer Collaboration found that from 1990 to 2015 the new cases of liver cancer per year increased by 75%. Estimates based on most recent data suggest that each year there are 841,000 new liver cancer diagnoses and 782,000 deaths across the globe. Liver cancer is the most common cancer in Egypt, the Gambia, Guinea, Mongolia, Cambodia, and Vietnam.  In terms of gender breakdown, globally liver cancer is more common in men than in women.

Given that HCC is the most common type of liver cancer, the areas around the world with the most new cases of HCC each year are Northern and Western Africa as well as Eastern and South-Eastern Asia. China has 50% of HCC cases globally, and more than 80% of total cases occur in sub-Saharan Africa or in East-Asia due to hepatitis B virus. In these high disease burden areas, evidence indicates the majority of the HBC and HCV infections occur via perinatal transmission (also called mother-to-child transmission). However, it is important to note that the risk factors for HCC varies by geographic region. For example, in China chronic HBV infection and aflatoxin are the largest risk factors; whereas, in Mongolia it is a combination of HBV and HCV co-infection and high levels of alcohol use that are driving the high levels of HCC.

In terms of intrahepatic cholangiocarcinoma, we currently do not have sufficient epidemiological data because it is a rare cancer. According to the United States National Cancer Institute, the incidence of cholangiocarcinoma is not known. Cholangiocarcinoma also has a significant geographical distribution, with Thailand showing the highest rates worldwide due to the presence of liver fluke.

In the United States there were 42,810 new cases of liver and intrahepatic bile duct cancer in 2020, which represents 2.4% of all new cancer cases in the United States. There are about 89.950 people who have liver and intrahepatic liver cancer in the United States. In terms of mortality, the 5-year survival rate for liver and intrahepatic bile duct cancers in the United States is 19.6%. In the United States there is an estimated 1% chance of getting liver cancer across the lifespan, which makes this cancer relatively rare. Despite the low number of cases, it is one of the top causes of cancer deaths.

References

External links 

 EASL Guideline
 Liver cancer information from Cancer Research UK

Digestive system neoplasia
C
Hepatology
Wikipedia medicine articles ready to translate